The East Turkestan Republic (ETR) was a short-lived satellite state of the Soviet Union in northwest Xinjiang (East Turkestan), between November 12, 1944, and December 22, 1949. To differentiate it from the First East Turkestan Republic (1933–1934) it is often described as the Second East Turkestan Republic, although the adjective Second was never an official part of its name. 

It began with the Ili Rebellion, in three districts: Ili, Tarbaghatai and Altai, in Xinjiang Province, which was part of the Republic of China. Initially it was backed by the USSR. During 1946, the ETR participated in the Xinjiang Provincial Coalition Government, while maintaining its independence. In February 1947, the officials of the ETR withdrew from the Coalition and re-asserted their independence, arguing that all of Xinjiang should be liberated from Chinese rule. The rest of Xinjiang was under Kuomintang control.

In late 1949, most of its key leaders and officials died in the Soviet Union, while they were travelling to attend talks in Beijing. Before the end of 1950, the Chinese People's Liberation Army (PLA) had captured most of the area of the ETR, which ceased to function. The entire region became part of the Xinjiang Uyghur Autonomous Region, in the People's Republic of China (PRC). Most of the area controlled by the ETR later fell under the jurisdiction of Ili Kazakh Autonomous Prefecture.

Background 

From 1934 to 1941 Xinjiang was under the influence of the Soviet Union. The local warlord Sheng Shicai was dependent on the Soviet Union for military support and trade. Soviet troops entered Xinjiang twice, in 1934 and 1937, for limited periods of time to give direct military support to Sheng Shicai's regime. After suppressing the 36th Division General Ma Chung-yin in 1934 and the withdrawal of Soviet troops in 1935, the USSR sent a commission to Xinjiang to draw up a plan for reconstruction of the province, led by Stalin's brother-in-law, Deputy Chief of Soviet State Bank, Alexander Svanidze, which resulted in a Soviet five-year loan of five million gold rubles to Sheng Shicai's regime. The draft was signed by Sheng Shicai on 16 May 1935, without consultation or approval by the Central Government of China. After Soviet intervention in 1937 and quelling of both Tungan and Uyghur rebels on the South of Xinjiang with liquidation of the 36th Tungan Division and 6th Uyghur Division, the Soviet Government did not withdraw all Soviet troops. A regiment of soldiers from the Ministry of Internal Affairs remained in Kumul beginning in October 1937, in order to prevent a possible offensive by the Imperial Japanese Army into Xinjiang via Inner Mongolia. In exchange, concessions were granted for oil wells, tin and tungsten mines and trade terms highly favorable to the USSR.

In 1936, after Sheng Shicai expelled 20,000 Kazakhs from Xinjiang (Barkol area) to Qinghai, Hui led by General Ma Bufang massacred their fellow Muslim Kazakhs, until only 135 remained.

On November 26, 1940, Sheng Shicai concluded an agreement granting the USSR additional concessions in the province of Xinjiang for fifty years, including areas bordering India and Tibet. This placed Xinjiang under virtually full political and economic control of the USSR, making it part of China in name only. Sheng Shicai recalled in his memoir, "Red Failure in Sinkiang," published by the University of Michigan in 1958, that Joseph Stalin pressured him to sign the secret Agreement of Concessions in 1940. The Agreement of Concessions, prepared by Stalin and seventeen articles long, would have resulted in Xinjiang sharing the same fate as Poland. Sheng Shicai was informed of this intended result by Soviet representatives in Ürümqi Bakulin and Karpov.

The first article of the agreement stated that The Government of Sinkiang agrees to extend to the Government of the USSR within the territory of Sinkiang exclusive rights to prospect for, investigate and exploit tin mines and its ancillary minerals. The USSR established a trust known as Sin-Tin as an independent juridical person subject only to legislative procedures of the USSR for implementation of the provisions of the agreement on Concessions in accordance with Article 4 with the right to establish without hindrance branch offices, sub-branch offices and agencies within the whole territory of Sinkiang with all supplies of needs of concessions, deliveries of equipment and materials and other imports from USSR and exports of minerals from Sinkiang free of custom duties and other imposts and taxes and payment of a fixed price of five percent of the cost of mined minerals to the Xinjiang Government. Article 5 stated that  During the period of validity of the present Agreement, the Government of Sinkiang shall guarantee the acquisition of lands, including the felling of timbers, the mining of coal and areas for the procurement of building materials, which may be necessary for the carrying on of the various kinds of works referred to in this Agreement. The Government of Sinkiang shall remove all the population residing in such areas as may have been allotted to Sin-tin. The Agreement granted USSR the right to seize land allotted to Sin-tin in any area of Xinjiang because Article 5 stated that  such areas of land shall be allotted on the application of Sin-tin. In the allotment of such areas of land, there shall be no delay and shall be in strict conformity with the terms of the application. The rental for such allotted areas shall be paid with the products of Sin-tin as provided for in Article 7 Following this agreement on Concessions, large-scale geological exploration expeditions were sent by the Soviets to Xinjiang in 1940 to 1941 and large deposits of uranium, beryllium and other minerals were found in the mountains near Kashgar and in the Altai region. Ores of both minerals continued to be delivered from Xinjiang Altai mines to the USSR until the end of 1949. Soviet geologists continued to work in Xinjiang until 1955, when Soviet leader Nikita Khrushchev refused Mao Zedong's demand to hand over the technology to produce PRC nuclear weapons. A Chinese atomic project was initiated using facilities built by the Soviet Union in Chuguchak and Altai in Northern Xinjiang. These facilities were used by the Soviet Union for nuclear weapon design and the creation of the first Soviet atomic bomb, successfully tested in the USSR on 29 August 1949.

Following Operation Barbarossa, the German invasion of the Soviet Union in June 1941, and the entry of the United States into World War II in December 1941, the Soviet Union became a less attractive patron for Sheng than the Kuomintang. By 1943 Sheng Shicai switched his allegiance to the Kuomintang after major Soviet defeats at the hands of the Germans in World War II, all Soviet Red Army military forces and technicians residing in the province were expelled, and the Republic of China National Revolutionary Army units and soldiers belonging to Ma Bufang moved into Xinjiang to take control of the province. Ma Bufang helped the Kuomintang build roads linking Qinghai and Xinjiang, which helped both of them bring Xinjiang under their influence. At August 1942 Sheng met Dekanozov, former Soviet ambassador to Nazi Germany and Vice Commissar of the Ministry of Foreign Affairs of the USSR, in Ürümqi and demanded that the Soviet Union withdraw all military forces and political officers from Xinjiang in three months and remove all Soviet equipment from the territory of Soviet Concessions, including closing the Soviet oil fields in Dushanzi (Jungaria) and the Soviet Aircraft Assembly Plant in Ürümqi (disguised as Agricultural Implements Manufacturing Factory). On 29 August 1942, the day after Dekanozov left Ürümqi, Sheng met Madame Chiang Kai-shek, wife of the Chinese Generalissimo, who flew to Ürümqi with a letter from Chiang Kai-shek promising his forgiveness to Sheng for all of his previous deals. Sheng was appointed the head of the Kuomintang branch in Xinjiang in 1943 and allowed Kuomintang cadres into the province. To forge his ties with Kuomintang, on 17 September 1942 Sheng arrested a number of Chinese communists sent to Xinjiang by the Central Committee of the Chinese Communist Party in 1938 and executed them in 1943. Among the executed was Mao Zemin, brother of Mao Zedong. In the summer of 1944, following the German defeat on the Eastern Front, Sheng attempted to reassert control over Xinjiang and turned to the Soviet Union for support again. He arrested a number of Kuomintang cadres in Ürümqi and sent a letter to Stalin offering to "incorporate Xinjiang into USSR as its 18th Soviet Socialistic Republic." Sheng Shicai asked Stalin for the post of ruler of the new Soviet Republic. Stalin refused to deal with Sheng and forwarded the confidential letter to Chiang Kai-shek. As a result, the Kuomintang removed him from the province in August 1944 and appointed him to a low-level post in the Ministry of Forestry in Chongqing.

In 1944, the Soviets took advantage of discontent among the Turkic peoples of the Ili region in northern Xinjiang to support a rebellion against Kuomintang rule in the province in order to reassert Soviet influence in the region.

Rebellion 

Many of the Turkic peoples of the Ili region of Xinjiang had close cultural, political, and economic ties with Russia and then the Soviet Union. Many of them were educated in the Soviet Union and a community of Russian settlers lived in the region. As a result, many of the Turkic rebels fled to the Soviet Union and obtained Soviet assistance in creating the Sinkiang Turkic People's Liberation Committee (STPNLC) in 1943 to revolt against Kuomintang rule during the Ili Rebellion. The pro-Soviet Uyghur who later became leader of the revolt and the Second East Turkestan Republic, Ehmetjan Qasim, was Soviet-educated and described as "Stalin's man" and as a "communist-minded progressive". Qasim Russified his surname to "Kasimov" and became a member of the Communist Party of the Soviet Union.

Liu Bin-Di was a Hui Muslim Kuomintang (KMT) officer and was sent by officials in Ürümqi to subdue the Hi area (Ili region) and crush the Turkic Muslims, who were prepared to overthrow Chinese rule. His mission failed because his troops arrived too late. Several Turkic cavalry units armed by the Soviets crossed into China in the direction of Kuldja. In November 1944 Liu was killed by Uyghur and Kazakh rebels backed by the Soviet Union. This started the Ili Rebellion, with the Uyghur Ili rebel army fighting against Republic of China forces.

Following Sheng Shicai's departure from Xinjiang, the new Kuomintang administration had increasing trouble maintaining law and order. On September 16, 1944, troops that had been sent to Gongha county, a majority Kazakh region, were unable to contain a group of rioters. By October 3, the rioters had captured Nilka, the county seat. On October 4, 1944, Chief of Ghulja (Yining) Police Department Liu Bin-Di sent telegram to Urumchi asking for immediate help: " Situation around Nilka 尼勒克镇 is catastrophic, on the battle of October 03 we suffered heavy losses, rebels captured many weapons and spread their actions south of Kash River 喀什河, our troops in Karasu 喀拉苏乡 and other adjacent villages are under siege, local population is joining bandits and increasing their strength, trucks with troops sent from Yining to Nilka delivered many wounded soldiers on return trip. On the head of bandits are Ghani, Fatikh, Akbar, Kurban, Baichurin and others, number of rebels is over 1,500. They are all mounted on horses. City of Yining is in danger, we arrested 200 suspects in the city as a precaution. Additional troops from Urumchi are in immediate necessity.". During October, the Three Districts Rebellion broke out south of Ghulja in the Ili, also in Altay and Tarbagatay districts of northern Xinjiang. Aided by the Soviet Union, and supported by several Xinjiang exiles trained in the Soviet Union, the rebels quickly established control over the three districts, capturing Ghulja in November. The ethnic Chinese population of the region was reduced by massacre and expulsion. According to United States consular officials, the Islamic scholar Elihan Töre declared a "Turkistan Islam Government":

The rebels assaulted Kulja on 7 November 1944 and rapidly took over parts of the city, massacring KMT troops, however, the rebels encountered fierce resistance from KMT forces holed up in the power and central police stations and did not take them until the 13th. The creation of the "East Turkestan Republic" (ETR) was declared on the 15th. The Soviet Army assisted the Ili Uyghur army in capturing several towns and airbases. Non-communist Russians like White Russians and Russian settlers who had lived in Xinjiang since the 19th century also helped the Soviet Red Army and the Ili Army rebels. They suffered heavy losses. Many leaders of the East Turkestan Republic were Soviet agents or affiliated with the Soviet Union, like Abdulkerim Abbas, Ishaq Beg, Saifuddin Azizi and the White Russians F. Leskin, A. Polinov, and Glimkin. When the rebels ran into trouble taking the vital Airambek airfield from the Chinese, Soviet military forces directly intervened to help mortar the Airambek and reduce the Chinese stronghold.

The rebels engaged in massacres of Han Chinese civilians, especially targeting people affiliated with the KMT and Sheng Shicai. In the "Kulja Declaration" issued on 5 January 1945, the East Turkestan Republic proclaimed that it would "sweep away the Han Chinese", threatening to extract a "blood debt" from the Han. The declaration also declared that the Republic would seek to especially establish cordial ties with the Soviets. The ETR later de-emphasized the anti-Han tone in their official proclamations after they were done massacring most of the Han civilians in their area. The massacres against the Han occurred mostly during 1944–45, with the KMT responding in kind by torturing, killing, and mutilating ETR prisoners. In territory controlled by the ETR like Kulja, various repressive measures were carried out, like barring Han from owning weapons, operating a Soviet-style secret police, and only making Russian and Turkic languages official and not Chinese. While the non-Muslim Tungusic peoples like the Xibe played a large role in helping the rebels by supplying them with crops, the local Muslim Tungan (Hui) in Ili gave either an insignificant and negligible contribution to the rebels or did not assist them at all.

The demands of the rebels included termination of Chinese rule, equality for all nationalities, recognised use of native languages, friendly relations with the Soviet Union, and opposition to Chinese immigration into Xinjiang. The military forces available to the rebellion were the newly formed Ili National Army (INA) and later renamed the East Turkestan National Army, which included mostly Uighur, Kazakh and White Russian soldiers (around 60,000 troops, armed and trained by the Soviet Union, strengthened with regular Red Army units, that included up to 500 officers and 2,000 soldiers), and a group of Kazakh Karai tribesmen under the command of Osman Batur (around 20,000 horsemen). The Kazakhs expanded to the north, while the INA expanded to the south. By September 1945, the Kuomintang Army and the INA occupied positions on either side of the Manasi River near Ürümqi. By this time the ETR held Zungaria and Kashgaria, while the Kuomintang held the Ürümqi (Tihuwa) area.

The "Ili National Army" (INA) which was established on 8 April 1945 as the military arm of the ETR, was led by the Kirghiz Ishaq Beg and the White Russians Polinov and Leskin, and all three were pro-Soviet and had a history of military service with Soviet-associated forces. The Soviets supplied the INA with ammunition and Russian-style uniforms, and Soviet troops directly helped the INA troops fight against the Chinese forces. The INA uniforms and flags all had insignia with the Russian acronym for "East Turkestan Republic", VTR in Cyrillic (Vostochnaya Turkestanskaya Respublika). Thousands of Soviet troops assisted Turkic rebels in fighting the Chinese army. In October 1945 suspected Soviet planes attacked Chinese positions.

As the Soviet Red Army and Uyghur Ili Army advanced with Soviet air support against poorly prepared Chinese forces, they almost reached Ürümqi; however, the Chinese military created rings of defences around the area, sending Chinese Muslim cavalry to halt the advance of the Turkic Muslim rebels. Thousands of Chinese Muslim troops under General Ma Bufang and his nephew General Ma Chengxiang poured into Xinjiang from Qinghai to combat the Soviet and Turkic Uyghur forces.

Much of the Ili army and equipment originated from the Soviet Union. The Ili rebel army pushed the Chinese forces across the plains and reached Kashgar, Kaghlik and Yarkand. However, the Uyghurs in the oases gave no support to the Soviet-backed rebels and, as a result, the Chinese army was able to expel them. The Ili rebels then butchered livestock belonging to Kirghiz and Tajiks of Xinjiang. The Soviet-backed insurgents destroyed Tajik and Kirghiz crops and moved aggressively against the Tajiks and Kirghiz of China. The Chinese beat back the Soviet-supported rebellion in Sarikol from August 1945 – 1946, defeating the siege of the "tribesman" around Yarkand when they had rebelled in Nanchiang around Sarikol, and killing Red Army officers.

The Chinese Muslim Ma Clique warlord of Qinghai, Ma Bufang, was sent with his Muslim cavalry to Ürümqi by the Kuomintang in 1945 to protect it from the Uyghur rebels from Ili. In 1945, the Tungan (Hui) 5th and 42nd Cavalry were sent from Qinghai to Xinjiang where they reinforced the KMT Second Army, composed of four divisions. Their combined forces made for 100,000 Hui and Han troops serving under KMT command in 1945. It was reported the Soviets were eager to "liquidate" Ma Bufang. General Ma Chengxiang, another Hui Ma Clique officer and nephew of Ma Bufang, commanded the First Cavalry Division in Xinjiang under the KMT, which was formerly the Gansu Fifth Cavalry Army.

A cease-fire was declared in 1946, with the Second East Turkestan Republic in control of Ili and the Chinese in control of the rest of Xinjiang, including Ürümqi.

Negotiations and Coalition Government in Ürümqi, and the end of ETR

In August 1945, China signed a Treaty of Friendship and Alliance granting the Soviet Union a range of concessions that the United States promised at the Yalta conference. This ended overt Soviet support for the East Turkestan Republic. The Kuomintang's central government of China reached a negotiated settlement with the leaders of the ETR in June 1946. According to the negotiated settlement, on 27 June 1946, the Committee of the Government of ETR laid down Resolution 324, to transform the Committee of the Government of ETR into the council of the Ili Prefecture of Xinjiang Province (the resolution use 'East Turkestan' to denote Xinjiang Province), and end the ETR. The new council was not a government, and the Three Districts were respectively and directly led by the newly founded Xinjiang Provincial Coalition Government along with the other seven districts in Xinjiang.

On 1 July 1946, the Xinjiang Provincial Coalition Government was established in Ürümqi. This government was constituted by three sides: the central government of China, the Three Districts, and the Uyghur-inhabited, anti-revolutionary Seven Districts (at the time, Xinjiang Province was divided into ten districts, and the Seven Districts were treated as a unit in the Coalition Government). In the 25 members of the Committee of the Coalition Government, there were seven from the central government, eight from the Three Districts, and ten from the Seven Districts. The communist Ehmetjan Qasim, the leader of the Three Districts, became the Provincial Vice Chairman.

As the establishment of the Coalition Government, the unpopular governor Wu Zhongxin (chairman of the Government of Xinjiang Province) was replaced by Zhang Zhizhong (chairman of the Xinjiang Provincial Coalition Government), who implemented pro-minority policies to placate the minority population in the Three Districts.

After the establishment of the Coalition Government, in effect, little changed in the Three Districts. The Three Districts remained a de facto separate pro-Soviet area with its own currency and military forces. At the beginning, all the three sides of the Coalition Government placed their hopes in it. The Three Districts side discussed with the Coalition Government and the Seven Districts the union of the economy, finance, transport, postal-service systems of the ten districts in Xinjiang again. They discussed the army reorganization of the Three Districts, too. The Three Districts had withdrawn their army from the Seven Districts.

However, as the domestic and international situation changed, and the contradiction in the Coalition Government deepened, the Coalition Government was on the verge of collapse in 1947. During 1946 and 1947, the Kuomintang actively supported some politicians opposing the Three Districts. By this time, these opposition politicians included Kazakh leader Osman Batur, who broke with the other rebels when their pro-Soviet orientation became clear. In the Coalition Government, there were several important anti-revolutionary Uyghurs appointed by the Kuomintang, such as Muhammad Amin Bughra, Isa Yusuf Alptekin and Masud Sabri. These three Uyghurs returned to Xinjiang with Zhang Zhizhong in 1945, when the negotiations started.

As there were too many difficulties, Zhang Zhizhong, the chairman of the Coalition Government, decided to escape from Xinjiang. Bai Chongxi, the Defense Minister of China and a Hui Muslim, was considered for appointment in 1947 as Governor of Xinjiang. But finally, according to Zhang Zhizhong's recommendation, the position was given instead to Masud Sabri, a pro-Kuomintang, anti-Soviet Uyghur.

On 21 May 1947, the central government appointed Masud Sabri the new chairman, and Isa Yusuf Alptekin the secretary-general of the Coalition Government. This was fiercely opposed by the Three Districts side, but supported by the Seven Districts side. Masud Sabri was close to conservatives in the CC Clique of the Kuomintang and undid all of Zhang Zhizhong's pro-minority reforms, which set off revolts and riots among the Uyghurs in the oases like Turfan (one of the Seven Districts. Riots in Turfan started in July 1947). On 12 August 1947, Ehmetjan Qasim (the vice-chairman of the Coalition Government and the leader of the Three Districts) left Ürümqi and returned to Ili. Soon afterwards, all the representatives in the Coalition Government from the Three Districts side returned to Ili, too. So the Coalition Government collapsed.

After the collapse, the Three Districts reverted to a de facto separate pro-Soviet area. However, this time the Three Districts never rebuilt the old ETR, but remained in Xinjiang Province. The leadership was firmly in the hands of communists. On 3 February 1947, the People's Revolutionary Party (in the Three Districts) and the Xinjiang Communist Union (in Ürümqi) incorporated into the Democratic Revolutionary Party (the chairman was Abdulkerim Abbas), and the party constitution clearly stipulated that one of the party's goals was to oppose the 'Pan-Turkism' and 'Pan-Islam'. Ehmetjan Qasim, Abdulkerim Abbas and other leaders of the Three Districts publicly declared that the Three Districts would not recreate the ETR, but must remain in Xinjiang and China. In order to establish a new organization to govern the Three Districts (from the beginning of the Coalition Government, when the government of ETR dissolved, the Three Districts lost a united government), in August 1948, the Xinjiang Democratic League of Peace Safeguarding was organized. It was both a political party and a leading organization of the Three Districts. To be noticeable, the party used "Xinjiang" in its name, but did not use "East Turkestan". This was a milestone for the Three Districts side.

After the Collapse of the Coalition Government
At the end of Chinese Civil War, in September 1949, when the Kuomintang army and provincial government of Xinjiang switched to the Chinese Communist Party (CCP) side, the Three Districts joined the CCP side, and accepted the leadership of CCP. Their revolution ended. The leaders of the Three Districts joined CCP (such as Saifuddin Azizi), and the army was reformed into the Fifth Army of the Chinese People's Liberation Army, then in the 1950s it was transformed into a part of the Xinjiang Production and Construction Corps.

Anti-ETR Uyghurs
The KMT CC Clique employed countermeasures in Xinjiang to prevent the conservative, traditionalist religious Uyghurs in the oases in southern Xinjiang from defecting to the pro-Soviet, pro-Russian ETR Uyghurs in Ili in northern Xinjiang. The KMT allowed three anti-Soviet, pan-Turkic nationalist Uyghurs, Masud Sabri, Muhammad Amin Bughra and Isa Yusuf Alptekin to write and publish pan-Turkic nationalist propaganda in order to incite the Turkic peoples against the Soviets, angering them. Anti-Soviet sentiment was espoused by Isa while pro-Soviet sentiment was espoused by Burhan. In 1949, according to Abdurahim Amin, violence broke out at Xinjiang College in Dihua (Ürümqi) between supporters of the Soviets and supporters of Turkey following the screening of a film on the Russo-Turkish wars.

The unpopular governor Wu Zhongxin was replaced after the cease-fire with Zhang Zhizhong, who implemented pro-minority policies to placate the Uyghur population. Bai Chongxi, the Defense Minister of China and a Muslim, was considered for appointment in 1947 as Governor of Xinjiang, but the position was given instead to Masud Sabri, a pro-Kuomintang, anti-Soviet Uyghur. Masud Sabri was close to conservatives in the CC Clique of the Kuomintang and undid all of Zhang Zhizhong's pro-minority reforms, which set off revolts and riots among the Uyghurs in the oases like Turfan.

American telegrams reported that the Soviet secret police threatened to assassinate Muslim leaders from Ining and put pressure on them to flee to "inner China" via Tihwa (Ürümqi), White Russians grew fearful of Muslim mobs as they chanted, "We freed ourselves from the yellow men, now we must destroy the white."

The pan-Turkist 3 Effendis (Üch Äpändi), Aisa Alptekin, Memtimin Bughra and Masud Sabri were anti-Soviet Uyghur leaders. The Second East Turkestan Republic attacked them as Kuomintang "puppets".

Achmad (Ehmetjan Qasim) strongly opposed Masud Sabri becoming governor.

Ehmetjan Qasim (Achmad-Jan), the Uyghur Ili leader, demanded that Masud Sabri be sacked as governor and that prisoners be released from Kuomintang jails as some of his demands to agreeing to visit Nanjing.

Uyghur linguist Ibrahim Muti'i opposed the Second East Turkestan Republic and the Ili Rebellion because it was backed by the Soviets and Stalin. The former ETR leader Saifuddin Azizi later apologized to Ibrahim and admitted that his opposition to the East Turkestan Republic was the correct thing to do.

Over 60,000 soldiers were in the Ili army according to General Sung.

Kazakh Defection
Osman Batur, the Kazakh leader, defected to the Kuomintang, and started fighting against the Soviet and Mongolian armies during the Pei-ta-shan Incident. The Tungan (Chinese Muslim or Hui) 14th Cavalry Regiment, which worked for the Kuomintang, was sent by the Chinese government to attack the Soviet and Mongol armies at Peitashan on the Xinjiang-Mongolia border.

The Salar Muslim Gen. Han Youwen, who served under Ma Bufang, commanded the Pau-an-dui (pacification soldiers), composed of three 340-man battalions. They were composed of men of many groups, including Kazakhs, Mongols and White Russians serving the Chinese regime. He served with Osman Batur and his Kazakh forces in battling the Three Districts Ili Uyghur and Soviet forces. The Three Districts forces in the Ashan zone were attacked, defeated and killed by Osman's Kazakh forces during an offensive in September 1947, supported by the Chinese. Osman's Kazakhs seized most of the towns in the Ashan zone from the Three Districts. The acting Soviet consul at Chenghua, Dipshatoff, directed the Red Army in aiding Three Districts Ili forces against Osman's Kazakhs.

Pei-ta-shan Incident

The Pei-ta-shan Incident was a border conflict between the Republic of China and the Mongolian People's Republic. The Chinese Muslim Hui cavalry regiment was sent by the Chinese government to attack Mongol and Soviet positions, resulting in the conflict.

Uncertainty of border demarcation opened the door to misunderstanding, if not to deliberate provocation, among Chinese, Soviet and Outer Mongolian patrols. A 1940 Soviet map presented the Mongolian-Xinjiang border further west than did the Russian maps of 1927, thereby giving Outer Mongolia an additional 83,000 square miles of land.

A Xinjiang police station manned by a Chinese police force with Chinese sentry posts existed in Xinjiang both before and after 1945.

Chinese Muslim and Kazakh forces working for the Kuomintang, battled Soviet and Mongol troops. In June 1947, the Mongols and the Soviets attacked the Kazakhs, driving them back to the Chinese side of the border. Fighting continued for another year, with thirteen clashes taking place between 5 June 1947, and July 1948.

Mongolia invaded Xinjiang to assist Li Rihan, the pro-Soviet Special Commissioner, gain control of Xinjiang from Special Commissioner Us Man (Osman), who supported the Republic of China. The Chinese defence ministry spokesman announced that Outer Mongolian soldiers were captured at Peitashan, and stated that troops were resisting near Peitashan.

Elite Qinghai Hui cavalry were sent by the Kuomintang to destroy the Mongols and the Russians in 1947.

Chinese troops recaptured Peitashan and continued to fight against Soviet and Mongolian bomber planes. China's Legislative Yuan demanded a firmer policy against Russia.

The Chinese General Ma Xizhen and the Kazakh Osman Batur fought the Mongol troops and airplanes throughout June 1947. The MPR used a battalion-size force and had Soviet air support in June 1947. The Mongolians repeatedly probed the Chinese lines.

Osman continued to fight against the Uyghur forces of the Yili regime in north Ashan after being defeated by Soviet forces.

Absorption by the People's Republic of China

In August 1949, the People's Liberation Army captured Lanzhou, the capital of the Gansu Province. Kuomintang administration in Xinjiang was threatened. The Kuomintang Xinjiang provincial leaders Tao Zhiyue and Burhan Shahidi led the KMT government and army's defection to the Chinese Communist Party (CCP) side in September 1949. By the end of 1949, some Kuomintang officials fled to Afghanistan, India and Pakistan, but most crossed over or surrendered to the CCP. On 17 August 1949, the Chinese Communist Party sent Deng Liqun to negotiate with the Three Districts' leadership in Ghulja (Yining in Chinese). Mao Zedong invited the leaders of the Three Districts to take part in the Chinese People's Political Consultative Conference later that year. The leaders of the Three Districts traveled to the Soviet Union on August 22 by automobiles through Horgos, accompanied by Soviet vice-consul in Ghulja Vasiliy Borisov, where they were told to cooperate with the Chinese Communist Party. Negotiations between Three Districts and Soviet representatives in Alma-Ata continued for three days and were difficult because of the unwillingness of Three Districts leader Ehmetjan Qasimi (whose strategy was opposed by two other delegates-Abdulkerim Abbas and Luo Zhi, while Generals Ishaq Beg and  Dalelkhan supported Ehmetjan) to agree to incorporate the Three Districts into the future Chinese communist state, supposedly in 1951. The People's Republic of China was proclaimed two years earlier, on 1 October 1949. Ehmetjan regarded the current situation as a historic opportunity for Uyghurs and other people of Xinjiang to gain freedom and independence that shouldn't be lost. So, the Three Districts delegation was offered to continue negotiations in Moscow directly with Stalin before departure to Beijing. On August 25, the eleven delegates, Ehmetjan Qasimi, Abdulkerim Abbas, Ishaq Beg, Luo Zhi, Dalelkhan Sugirbayev and accompanying officers of the Three Districts, boarded  Ilyushin Il-12 plane in Alma-Ata, Kazakhstan, officially heading to Beijing, but flight was diverted for Moscow. On September 3, the Soviet Union informed the Chinese government that the plane had crashed near Lake Baikal en route to Beijing, killing all on board. On the same day Molotov sent a telegram to Ghulja to inform Saifuddin Azizi (interim leader of the Three Districts when Ehmetjan Qasimi was not in Ili, and a member of Communist Party of Soviet Union) about the Tragic death of devoted revolutionaries, including Ehmetjan Qasimi, in airplane crash near Lake Baikal en route to Beijing. In accordance with instructions from Moscow, Saifuddin Azizi kept the news secret from the population of the Three Districts and it was unreported by Beijing for several months until December 1949, when Saifuddin Azizi departed to Moscow to join Mao Zedong's delegation to sign Sino-Soviet Treaty of Friendship with Stalin and to retrieve bodies of The Three Districts leaders ( their already unrecognisable bodies were delivered from the USSR in April 1950) and when the People's Liberation Army of China had already secured most of the regions of the former Xinjiang Province.

After the dissolution of the Soviet Union in 1991, some former KGB generals and high officers (among them Pavel Sudoplatov) revealed that the five leaders were killed on Stalin's orders in Moscow on 27 August 1949, after a three-day imprisonment in the former Tsar's stables, having been arrested upon arrival in Moscow by the Head of MGB Colonel General Viktor Abakumov, who personally interrogated the Three Districts leaders, then ordered their execution. This was allegedly done in accordance with a deal between Stalin and Mao Zedong, but this allegation has never been confirmed. The remaining important figures of the Three Districts, including Saifuddin Azizi (who led the Second delegation of the Three Districts, which participated in Chinese People's Political Consultative Conference in September in Beijing, which proclaimed the People's Republic of China on 1 October 1949), agreed to incorporate the Three Districts into the Xinjiang Province and accept important positions within the administration. However, some Kazakhs led by Osman Batur continued their resistance until 1954. Saifuddin then became the first chairman of the Xinjiang Uyghur Autonomous Region, which replaced Xinjiang Province in 1955. First People's Liberation Army units arrived at Ürümqi airport on 20 October 1949 on Soviet airplanes, provided by Stalin, and quickly established control in northern Xinjiang, then, together with units of the National Army of the Three Districts, entered southern Xinjiang, thus establishing control over all ten districts of Xinjiang Province. Earlier, on a single day, on 26 September 1949, 100,000 Kuomintang Army troops in the province switched their allegiance from Kuomintang to the Chinese Communist Party together with the Chairman of Xinjiang Provincial Government Burhan Shahidi, who was among the few who knew what actually happened to the First delegation of the Three Districts in August in the USSR. On 20 December 1949 the Ili National Army joined PLA as its 5th Army. The province's final status was instituted in 1955, when it was reorganised into an autonomous region for the 13 nationalities of Xinjiang ( Uyghur, Han Chinese, Kazakh, Kyrgyz, Hui, Mongol, Tajik, Uzbek, Tatar, Russian, Xibe, Daur, Manchu people).

National army

The National Army of the Second East Turkestan Republic was formed on 8 April 1945, and originally consisted of six regiments:
 Suidun infantry regiment
 Ghulja regiment
 Kensai regiment
 Ghulja reserve regiment
 Kazakh cavalry regiment
 Tungan regiment
 Sibo battalion
 Mongol battalion

General conscription of all races, except the Chinese, into the National Army was enforced in the Ili zone.

Later, Sibo and Mongol battalions were upgraded to regiments. When Kazakh irregulars under Osman Batur defected to the Kuomintang in 1947, the Kazakh cavalry regiment of National Army also defected to Osman Batur. The motorized part of Army consisted of an Artillery Division, which included twelve cannons, two armoured vehicles, and two tanks. National aviation forces included forty-two airplanes, captured at a Kuomintang air base in Ghulja on 31 January 1945; all of them were damaged during the battle for the base. Some of these aircraft were repaired and put into service by Soviet military personnel in ETR. These airplanes participated in the battle between Ili rebels and the Kuomintang for Shihezi and Jinghe in September 1945.

This battle resulted in the capture of both KMT bases and oil fields in Dushanzi. During the battle, one more Kuomintang airplane was captured, detachments of National Army reached Manasi River north of Ürümqi, which caused panic in the city. Government offices were evacuated to Kumul. An offensive on Xinjiang's capital was cancelled due to direct pressure from Moscow on Ili rebels' leadership, which agreed to follow orders from Moscow to begin peace talks with Kuomintang. Moscow ordered the National Army to cease fire on all frontiers. First peace talks between Ili rebels and Kuomintang followed Chiang Kai-shek's speech on China State Radio, offering "to peacefully resolve Xinjiang crisis" with the rebels. These peace talks were mediated by the Soviet Union and started in Ürümqi on 14 October 1945.

The National Army enlisted 25,000 to 30,000 troops. In accordance with the peace agreement with Chiang Kai-shek signed on 6 June 1946, this number was reduced to 11,000 to 12,000 troops and restricted to stations in only the Three Districts (Ili, Tarbaghatai and Altai) of northern Xinjiang. National Army detachments were also withdrawn from Southern Xinjiang, leaving the strategic city of Aksu and opening the road from Ürümqi to the Kashgar region. This obvious mistake of Ili rebels allowed the Kuomintang to deploy 70,000 troops from 1946 to 1947 into Southern Xinjiang and quell the rebellion in the Pamir Mountains.

This rebellion had broken on 19 August 1945, in the Sariqol area of Taghdumbash Pamir. Rebels led by the Uyghur Sadiq Khan Khoja from Kargilik and the Sariqoli Tajik Karavan Shah captured all the border posts near the Afghan, Soviet and Indian borders (Su-Bashi, Daftar, Mintaka Qarawul, Bulunqul), and a Tashkurgan fortress, killing Kuomintang troops. The rebels took Kuomintang troops by surprise as they celebrated the capitulation of Japanese Army in Manchuria. A few Kuomintang forces in Sariqol survived and fled to India during the rebel attack. The original base of the rebellion was situated on the mountainous Pamir village of Tagarma, near the Soviet border. On 15 September 1945, Tashkurgan rebels took Igiz-Yar fortress on the road to Yangihissar, while another group of rebels simultaneously took Oitagh, Bostan-Terek and Tashmalik on the road to Kashgar.

By the end of 1945, Tashkurgan rebels had attacked Kashgar and Yarkand districts. On 2 January 1946, while the Preliminary Peace Agreement was signed in Ürümqi between Ili rebels and Kuomintang representatives under Soviet mediation, rebels took Guma, Kargilik and Poskam, important towns controlling communications between Xinjiang, Tibet and India. On 11 January 1946, the Kuomintang Army counter-attacked the Yarkand military zone, bringing reinforcements from Aksu Region. The counter-attackers repelled Tashkurgan rebels from the outskirts of Yarkand, recaptured the towns of Poskam, Kargilik and Guma and brought the Tashkurgan Region back under Chinese control by the summer of 1946.

Only a few hundred of the originally 7,000 Tashkurgan rebel force survived. The survivors retreated to the mountainous Pamir base in Qosrap (village in present-day Akto County). The National Army was  inactive in Kashgar and Aksu from 1946 to 1949 until the arrival of People's Liberation Army (PLA) units in Xinjiang.

Deng Liqun, a special envoy of Mao Zedong, arrived at Ghulja on 17 August 1949 to negotiate with the Three Districts leadership about the districts' future. Deng sent a secret telegram to Mao about the Three Districts forces the following day. He listed these forces as including about 14,000 troops, armed mostly with German weapons, heavy artillery, 120 military trucks and artillery-towing vehicles, and around 6,000 cavalry horses. Soviet military personnel were present in the Army and serviced fourteen airplanes, which were used as bombers. On 20 December 1949, the National Army was incorporated into the PLA as its Xinjiang 5th Army Corps.

Press
The newspaper of East Turkestan was Azat Sherkiy Turkistan (Free Eastern Turkestan), first published on 17 November 1944, in Ghulja five days after the establishment of the Second ETR Government. The newspaper was later renamed as Inqlawiy Sherkiy Turkistan (Revolutionary Eastern Turkestan).

Related events and people

According to her autobiography, Dragon Fighter: One Woman's Epic Struggle for Peace with China, Rebiya Kadeer's father served with pro-Soviet Uyghur rebels under the Second East Turkestan Republic in the Ili Rebellion (Three Province Rebellion) in 1944–1946, using Soviet assistance and aid to fight the Republic of China government under Chiang Kai-shek. Kadeer and her family were close friends with White Russian exiles living in Xinjiang and Kadeer recalled that many Uyghurs thought Russian culture was "more advanced" than that of the Uyghurs and they "respected" the Russians a lot.

In the Xinjiang conflict, the Soviet Union again backed Uyghur separatists against China, starting in the 1960s. The Soviet Union incited separatist activities in Xinjiang through propaganda, encouraging Kazakhs to flee to the Soviet Union and attacking China. China responded by reinforcing the Xinjiang-Soviet border area specifically with Han Xinjiang Production and Construction Corps ("Bingtuan" in Chinese) militia and farmers. The Soviets intensified their broadcasts inciting Uyghurs to revolt against the Chinese via Radio Tashkent since 1967 and directly harbored and supported separatist guerilla fighters to attack the Chinese border, in 1966 there were 5.000 Soviet-sponsored separatist attacks on China. The Soviets transmitted a radio broadcast from Radio Tashkent into Xinjiang on 14 May 1967, boasting of the fact that the Soviets had supported the Second East Turkestan Republic against China. In addition to Radio Tashkent, other Soviet media outlets urged Uyghurs to proclaim independence and revolt against China, including Radio Alma-Ata and the Alma-Ata published Sherki Türkistan Evazi ("The Voice of Eastern Turkestan") newspaper. After the Sino-Soviet split in 1962, over 60,000 Uyghurs and Kazakhs defected from Xinjiang to the Kazakh Soviet Socialist Republic, in response to Soviet propaganda which promised Xinjiang independence. Uyghur exiles later threatened China with rumors of a Uyghur "liberation army" in the thousands that were supposedly recruited from Sovietized émigrés.

The Soviet Union was involved in funding and support for the East Turkestan People's Revolutionary Party (ETPRP), the largest militant Uyghur separatist organization in its time, to start a violent uprising against China in 1968. In the 1970s, the Soviets also supported the United Revolutionary Front of East Turkestan (URFET) to fight against the Chinese.

"Bloody incidents" in 1966–67 flared as Chinese and Soviet forces clashed along the border as the Soviets trained anti-Chinese guerillas and urged Uyghurs to revolt against China, hailing their "national liberation struggle". In 1969, Chinese and Soviet forces directly fought each other along the Xinjiang-Soviet border.

The Soviet Union supported Uyghur nationalist propaganda and Uyghur separatist movements against China. Soviet historians claimed that the Uyghur native land was Xinjiang and Uyghur nationalism was promoted by Soviet versions of Turcological history. Soviet Turcologists like D.I. Tikhonov wrote pro-independence works on Uyghur history and the Soviet-supported Uyghur historian Tursun Rakhimov wrote more historical works supporting Uyghur independence and attacking the Chinese government, claiming that Xinjiang was an entity created by China from parts of East Turkestan and Zungharia. These Soviet Uyghur historians waged an "ideological war" against China, emphasizing the "national liberation movement" of Uyghurs throughout history. The Soviet Communist Party supported the publication of works which glorified the Second East Turkestan Republic and the Ili Rebellion against China in its anti-China propaganda war. Soviet propaganda writers wrote works claiming that Uyghurs lived better lives and were able to practice their culture only in Soviet Central Asia and not in Xinjiang. In 1979 Soviet KGB agent Victor Louis wrote a thesis claiming that the Soviets should support a "war of liberation" against "imperial" China to support Uighur, Tibetan, Mongol and Manchu independence. The Soviet KGB supported Uyghur separatists against China.

Xinjiang's importance to China increased after the Soviet invasion of Afghanistan in 1979, leading to China's perception of being encircled by the Soviets. China supported the Afghan mujahideen during the Soviet invasion, and broadcast reports of Soviet atrocities on Afghan Muslims to Uyghurs in order to counter Soviet propaganda broadcasts into Xinjiang, which boasted that Soviet minorities lived better and incited Muslims to revolt. Chinese radio beamed anti-Soviet broadcasts to Central Asian ethnic minorities like the Kazakhs. The Soviets feared disloyalty among the non-Russian Kazakh, Uzbek and Kyrgyz in the event of Chinese troops attacking the Soviet Union and entering Central Asia. Russians were goaded with the taunt "Just wait till the Chinese get here, they'll show you what's what!" by Central Asians when they had altercations. The Chinese authorities viewed the Han migrants in Xinjiang as vital to defending the area against the Soviet Union. China opened camps to train the Afghan Mujahideen near Kashgar and Khotan and supplied them with hundreds of millions of dollars worth of small arms, rockets, mines, and anti-tank weapons.

Similar Soviet-supported states
The Soviet Union set up similar puppet-states in Pahlavi-dynasty Iran in the form of the Azerbaijan People's Government and Republic of Mahabad. The Soviet Union used comparable methods and tactics in both Xinjiang and Iran upon establishing the Kurdish Republic of Mahabad and Autonomous Republic of Azerbaijan. The American ambassador to the Soviet Union sent a telegram to Washington DC noting the similarity of the situations in Iranian Azerbaijan and in Xinjiang.

See also
 First East Turkestan Republic
 East Turkestan independence movement
 East Turkistan Government-in-Exile
 History of Xinjiang

Notes

References

Citations

Sources 

 
 
 
 
 
 Burhan S., Xinjiang wushi nian [Fifty Years in Xinjiang], (Beijing, Wenshi ziliao, 1984).
 
 
 
 Clubb, O. E., China and Russia: The 'Great Game'. (NY, Columbia, 1971).
 
 
 
 
 Hasiotis, A. C. Jr. Soviet Political, Economic and Military Involvement in Sinkiang from 1928 to 1949 (NY, Garland, 1987).
 
 
 
 Khakimbaev A. A., 'Nekotorye Osobennosti Natsional'no-Osvoboditel'nogo Dvizheniya Narodov Sin'tszyana v 30-kh i 40-kh godakh XX veka' [Some Characters of the National-Liberation Movement of the Xinjiang Peoples in 1930s and 1940s], in Materially Mezhdunarodnoi Konferentsii po Problemam Istorii Kitaya v Noveishchee Vremya, Aprel' 1977, Problemy Kitaya (Moscow, 1978) pp. 113–118.
 Kotov, K. F., Mestnaya Natsional'nya Avtonomiya v Kitaiskoi Narodnoi Respublike—Na Primere Sin'tszyansko-Uigurskoi Avtonomoi Oblasti, [Autonomy of Local Nationalities in the Chinese People's Republic, as an Example of the Xinjiang Uighur Autonomous Region], (Moscow, Gosudarstvennoe Izdatel'stvo Yuridichekoi Literaturi, 1959).
 Kutlukov, M., 'Natsionlal'no-Osvoboditel'noe Dvizhenie 1944–1949 gg. v Sin'tszyane kak Sostavnaya Chast' Kitaiskoi Narodnoi Revolyutsii', [The National-Liberation Movement of 1944–1949 in Xinjiang as a Part of the People's Revolution in China], in Sbornik Pabot Aspirantov, Otdelenie Obshchestvennykh Hauk, AN UzbSSR, Bypusk 2 (Tashkent, 1958) pp. 261–304.
 Lattimore, O., Pivot of Asia: Sinkiang and the Inner Asian Frontiers of China (Boston, Little, Brown & Co., 1950).
 
  Alt URL
 
 
 
 Mingulov, N. N., 'Narody Sin'tszyana v Bop'be za Ustanovlenue Harodnoi Demokratii 1944–1949 gg.', [The Xinjiang Peoples in Struggle for Establishment of People's Democracy, 1944–1949], (Abstract of Dissertation in Moscow National University, 1956).
 
 'Natsionlal'no-Osvoboditel'noe Dvizhenie Narodov Sin'tszyana kak Sostavnaya Chast' * Obshchekitaiskoi Revolyutsii (1944–1949 gody)', [The National-Liberation Movement of the Peoples in Xinjiang in 1944–1949 as a Part of the People's Revolution in China], in Trudi: Instituta Istorii, Arkheologii i Etnografii, Tom 15 (Alma-Ata, 1962) pp. 68–102.
 
 
 
 
 Rakhimov, T. R. 'Mesto Bostochno-Turkestanskoi Respubliki (VTR) v Natsional'no-Osvoboditel'noi Bor'be Narodov Kitaya' [Role of the Eastern Turkestan Republic (ETR) in the National Liberation Struggle of the Peoples in China], A paper presented at 2-ya Nauchnaya Konferentsiya po Problemam Istorii Kitaya v Noveishchee Vremya, (Moscow, 1977), pp. 68–70.
 
 
 
 
 Saviskii, A. P. 'Sin'tszyan kak Platsdarm Inostrannoi Interventsii v Srednei Azii', [Xinjiang as a Base for Foreign Invasion into Central Asia], (Abstract of Dissertation in the Academy of Science, the Uzbekistan SSR), (AN UzbSSR, Tashkent, 1955).
 
 
 Taipov, Z. T., V Bor'be za Svobodu [In the Struggle for Freedom], (Moscow, Glavnaya Redaktsiya Vostochnoi Literaturi Izdatel'stvo Nauka, 1974).
 
 
 
 Wang, D., 'The Xinjiang Question of the 1940s: the Story behind the Sino-Soviet Treaty of August 1945', Asian Studies Review, vol. 21, no.1 (1997) pp. 83–105.
 
 
 
 
 'The USSR and the Establishment of the Eastern Turkestan Republic in Xinjiang', Journal of Institute of Modern History, Academia Sinica, vol.25 (1996) pp. 337–378.
 Yakovlev, A. G., 'K Voprosy o Natsional'no-Osvoboditel'nom Dvizhenii Norodov Sin'tzyana v 1944–1949', [Question on the National Liberation Movement of the Peoples in Xinjiang in 1944–1945], in Uchenie Zapiski Instituta Voctokovedeniia Kitaiskii Spornik vol.xi, (1955) pp. 155–188.
 Wang, David D. Under the Soviet shadow: the Yining Incident: ethnic conflicts and international rivalry in Xinjiang, 1944–1949. Hong Kong: The Chinese University Press, 1999.
 
 Benson, Linda, The Ili Rebellion: The Moslem challenge to Chinese authority in Xinjiang, 1944–1949, Armonk, New York: M. E. Sharpe, 1990. .
 James A. Millward and Nabijan Tursun, "Political History and Strategies of Control, 1884–1978" in Xinjiang: China's Muslim Borderland. .
 
 
 
 徐玉圻 (Chief Editor). 《新疆三区革命史》, 民族出版社, 1998.
 厉声 (Chief Editor). 《中国新疆历史与现状》, 人民出版社, 2003.

China–Soviet Union relations
East Turkestan independence movement
East Turkestan Republic, Second
East Turkestan
20th century in Xinjiang
Soviet satellite states
States and territories established in 1944
States and territories disestablished in 1946
1944 establishments in China
1946 disestablishments in China
Ili Rebellion